The Asia/Oceania Zone was one of the three zones of the regional Davis Cup competition in 1996.

In the Asia/Oceania Zone there were three different tiers, called groups, in which teams competed against each other to advance to the upper tier. Winners in Group III advanced to the Asia/Oceania Zone Group II in 1997. In a move to a four-tier system, the bottom five teams were re-assigned to the new Group IV in 1997; all other teams remained in Group III.

Participating nations

Draw
 Venue: Aviation Club Tennis Centre, Dubai, United Arab Emirates
 Date: 18–24 March

Group A

Group B

  and  promoted to Group II in 1997.

Group A

Kazakhstan vs. Malaysia

Oman vs. Pacific Oceania

Singapore vs. Syria

Kazakhstan vs. Syria

Malaysia vs. Oman

Pacific Oceania vs. Singapore

Kazakhstan vs. Singapore

Malaysia vs. Pacific Oceania

Oman vs. Syria

Kazakhstan vs. Oman

Malaysia vs. Singapore

Pacific Oceania vs. Syria

Kazakhstan vs. Pacific Oceania

Malaysia vs. Syria

Oman vs. Singapore

Group B

Bangladesh vs. Brunei

Jordan vs. Kuwait

Lebanon vs. Qatar

United Arab Emirates vs. Lebanon

Bangladesh vs. Kuwait

Brunei vs. Jordan

United Arab Emirates vs. Bangladesh

Brunei vs. Kuwait

Jordan vs. Qatar

United Arab Emirates vs. Qatar

Bangladesh vs. Jordan

Brunei vs. Lebanon

United Arab Emirates vs. Brunei

Bangladesh vs. Lebanon

Kuwait vs. Qatar

United Arab Emirates vs. Jordan

Bangladesh vs. Qatar

Kuwait vs. Lebanon

United Arab Emirates vs. Kuwait

Brunei vs. Qatar

Jordan vs. Lebanon

References

External links
Davis Cup official website

Davis Cup Asia/Oceania Zone
Asia Oceania Zone Group III